Dulce Nombre is a district of the Cartago canton, in the Cartago province of Costa Rica.

History 
Dulce Nombre was created on 12 November 1925 by Acuerdo 605.

Geography 
Dulce Nombre has an area of  km² and an elevation of  metres.

Demographics 

For the 2011 census, Dulce Nombre had a population of  inhabitants.

Culture 
Important research and education institutions are located in this district:
The main campus of the Costa Rica Institute of Technology.
Lankester Botanical Garden (named after British biologist Charles Lankester).

Transportation

Road transportation 
The district is covered by the following road routes:
 National Route 2
 National Route 10
 National Route 405

References 

Districts of Cartago Province
Populated places in Cartago Province